Paisa Vasool may refer to:
 Paisa Vasool (2004 film), an Indian film
 Paisa Vasool (2017 film), an Indian Telugu-language action comedy film